Neverwinter Nights is a series of video games developed by BioWare and Obsidian Entertainment, based on the Forgotten Realms campaign setting of the Dungeons & Dragons role-playing game. Aside from also being set in the Dungeons & Dragons world and around its city Neverwinter, it is unrelated to both the 1991 Neverwinter Nights online game and the 2013 online game called Neverwinter.

Overview 
The Neverwinter Nights series take place primarily in the city of Neverwinter, located in the Sword Coast region of the fictional land of Faerûn. Also commonly referred to as the City of Skilled Hands, Neverwinter grew from a multi-racial settlement named Eigersstor founded several hundred years prior to the start of Neverwinter Nights. At the time the first game takes place, the city of Neverwinter was beset by a magical plague named the Wailing Death, whereas in the second game the city is threatened by an invasion from its ancient enemy named the King of Shadows.

Gameplay 
The Neverwinter Nights series is a franchise of role-playing games with a third-person isometric perspective. The systems of the games are based on the rules of Dungeons & Dragons, a table-top role-playing game originally developed by TSR, Inc. Both Neverwinter Nights and Neverwinter Nights 2 contain three game modes: a default campaign, a multiplayer mode, and custom contents.

Campaign 

Both Neverwinter Nights and Neverwinter Nights 2 include a default campaign, which focus on the development of the player character through a series of distinct acts. In addition to the main story, the player also has the opportunity to undertake a variety of side quests, some of which form storylines that span the entire game. The player has the ability to make key choices in specific quests can affect combat encounters, key plot points, and the outcome of the overarching story.

Before the player can begin the campaign, they must first create a new character through the game's character creation interface. The player may customize a new character from scratch, or select one of the pre-set characters provided by the games. If the player chooses to create a new character, they are then guided through a series of choices about their character, including race, class, appearance etc.. Some of the choices such as gender and appearance are purely cosmetic, whereas others such as race and class affect how the player character fights and what abilities they have access to.

Custom content 
In addition to the base campaign and the multiplayer mode, both Neverwinter Nights and Neverwinter Nights 2 also included sets of software development tools which allow the players to create custom campaigns which they can then share with other players. Neverwinter Nights shipped with the Aurora Toolset, while Neverwinter Nights 2 shipped with the Electron Toolset, which was completely rewritten by Bioware using the programming language C#.

Reception 
The first instalment in the series, Neverwinter Nights, was generally well received according to review aggregator Metacritic, which gave it a score of 91/100 based on 34 critic reviews and a score of 8.1/10 based on 608 user reviews. Greg Kasavin of GameSpot praised the game's accessibility, calling it "one of those exceedingly rare games that has a lot to offer virtually everyone, even if they aren't already into RPGs". Gamezone appreciated the game's graphic and sound design, and that "the musical score foreshadows game action (the music picks up in intensity when combat looms), and is well done". Allgame reviewer Mark Hoogland commended the Aurora toolset shipped with Neverwinter Nights, calling the breadth of level, story, environment, and module creation options "impressive". Eurogamer reviewer Gestalt was less convinced, criticising the single-player campaign's emphasis on combat encounters over "actual roleplaying", but was optimistic that the game's mod support will give it longevity.

Compared to Neverwinter Nights, Neverwinter Nights 2 received a lower Metacritic score of 82/100 based on 46 critic reviews and 6.6/10 based on 633 user reviews. The game's story continued to attract praise from critics such as Greg Mueller of GameSpot, who was impressed by the "very apparent" impact that player choice has on the way the story unfolds. Some critics like IGN's Charles Onyett also enjoyed the game's sound and graphics design, in particular the visceral orchestral soundtrack during battles.

A common complaint from critics was Neverwinter Nights 2's numerous technical glitches. Eurogamer drew particular attention to the bugs surrounding "pathfinding and NPCs' artificial intelligence", a problem which contributor Kieron Gillen found made precise control in combat difficult. IGN also acknowledged the game's technical glitches, but commented that none of them "hampered... gameplay experience".

Legacy 
The Neverwinter Nights series has been adopted by a number of educators for use in the classroom. University of Alberta's Professor Mike Carbonara and colleagues made use of the Aurora Toolset to develop an "economics game" aimed at teaching the concepts of fixed price commerce, mark up, and supply and demand. Squire & Jenkins at MIT Education Arcade created the multiplayer game Revolution, which allows players to roleplay characters with different dispositions and political views in 1770s colonial Williamsburg, with an aim to improve the student's understanding of the American Revolution. In 2005, researchers Nora Paul and Kathleen A. Hansen designed a custom module for journalism students; players took on the role of a journalist investigating a train derailment in the fictional American town named Harperville, during which they must investigate and analyse multiple sources.

Games 

 A "premium module" is a small-scale, stand-alone adventure.
 An "adventure pack" is similar to the first game's premium modules.

References 

 
Video game franchises introduced in 2002